Dadieso is a community and the district capital of the Suaman District in the Western North Region of Ghana. It is the location of the Dadieso Forest Reserve.

Institution 

 Dadieso Senior High School

Notable native 

 DJ Switch (Ghanaian DJ)

References 

Western North Region
Communities in Ghana
Populated places in the Western North Region